Karakoram International University or Karakoram University (KIU) is an international level university in Gilgit-Baltistan, Pakistan. It was established in 2002 with a charter from the Federal Government of Pakistan, with the goal of improving access to higher education for the people of Gilgit-Baltistan. The KIU is one of two public university in the Gilgit–Baltistan region of Pakistan, along with University of Baltistan in Skardu.

There are two faculties - Sciences, and Humanities and Social Sciences. A third faculty of Mountain Area Development Studies is still in the planning stage.

The KIU has been chartered as a multi-campus institution, The campus, situated on University Road in Gilgit, is well-constructed; however, Skardu Campus was established in 2011 with programs from four departments. The Skardu Campus is under construction. The core facilities are complete and around 2000 students were enrolled in 2007. A third of them were women.

It was announced that Chinese lessons would be offered in order to increase trade ties with China.

History 
The Karakoram International University is the first university in Gilgit-Baltistan which provides quality education to the students of every district. It was established a charter from the Federal Government of Pakistan and by the orders of then president Pervez Musharraf.

Karakoram International University is situated before the backdrop of steep mountains at the junction point of Ghizer and Hunza River.

The main campus of the university is located in Konodass Gilgit. Gilgit the Headquarter of Gilgit-Baltistan. Gilgit has become a metropolitan which keeps a vast environment to provide every necessity in every aspect of life. It has its own airport, providing daily flights to Islamabad. The famous Karakoram Highway (KKH) connects Pakistan with China, passing through the District of Hunza. A little part of Karakoram Highway connects Gilgit with Skardu (Baltistan).

Gilgit's weather is partially hot. It gets very hot in June and July, whereas it is severely cold in December and January. However, traffic of the road and air continue throughout the year.

There are two main campuses of The Karakoram International University. Its main campus situated on the University Road, which is easily accessible from the airport and the bus station. Now, a bridge has been constructed between the Gilgit airport and the University. Taxis and other vehicles are available all around the city and are a convenient method of transportation.

The sub-campus, i.e. Skardu Campus of Karakoram University was inaugurated by the Former Chief Minister Gilgit-Balitistan Syed Mehdi Shah in July 2011. This campus is located at the Hussainabad road Skardu.

According to its charter, Karakoram International University is a multi-campus university. Additional campuses are seeking to be established in wherever feasible according to the availability of government and local support. Currently, the main campus of Karakoram University  has nearly 2300 students, more than 100 faculty members and over a hundred administrative staff in sixteen academic departments. The Skardu Campus has been started with four main departments i.e. English, Computer Sciences, Business Management and Education.

Academics

Bachelor's degree Programs 
 Bachelor of Science in Computer Sciences BS (CS)
 Bachelor of Business Administration-BB (IT)
 Bachelor of Science in International Relations (BS)
 Bachelor of Science in Agriculture major in Food Technology (BS)
 Bachelor of Arts in English (BA Hons)
 Bachelor of Science in Chemistry (BS)
 Bachelor of Arts in Education (B.Ed) Elementary 4 years (pre step)
 Bachelor of Science in Biology (Animal Sciences) (BS)
 Bachelor of Science in Biology (Plant sciences) (BS)
 Bachelor of Science in Media and Communication (BS)
 Bachelor of Science in Physics (BS)
 Bachelor of Science in Economics (BS)
 Bachelor of Science in Environmental Science (BS)
 Bachelor of Science in Behavioral Sciences. (BS)
 Bachelor of Science in Earth Sciences (Geology) (BS)
 Bachelor of Science in Earthquake Engineering (BS)
 Bachelor of Science in Mining Engineering (BS)
 Bachelor of Business Administration - Management (BBA)
 Bachelor of Science in Mathematics (BS)
 Bachelor of Science in Statistics (BS)
 Bachelor of Computer Arts (BCA)
 Bachelor of Fine Arts (BFA)
 Bachelor's degree in Design (Communication Design) BCD

Master's degree Programs 
 Master of Science in Mathematics (M.Sc)
 Master of Science in Statistics (M.Sc)
 Master of Science in International Relations (M.Sc)
 Master of Science in Chemistry (M.Sc)
 Master of Arts in English Literature (MA)
 Master of Arts in English Linguistics (MA)
 Master of Science in Agriculture in Food Technology
 Master of Science in Behavioral Sciences (M.Sc)
 Master of Arts in Education (MA)
 Master of Science in Economics (M.Sc)
 Master of Science in Biology (Animal Sciences)
 Master of Science in Biology (Plant sciences)
 Master of Science in Physics (M.Sc)
 Master of Business Administration in Management (Regular) MBA

Self support evening master's programs 
The following programs are taken at evening time for self-support students.
 Master of Information Technology (MIT PGD in Computer Sciences)
 Master of Science in Media & Communication Studies (M.Sc)
 Master of Business Administration (Executive) MBA
 Master of Education M.Ed (One Year Diploma)
 Diploma in Agriculture
 Master of Science in Economics & Finance M.Sc

Campuses 

The primary campus is situated on University Road in Gilgit. In 2011, KIU founded a satellite campus in Skardu. In 2016 KIU founded another satellite campus in Hunza.

In August 2017, a new USAID-funded Faculty of Education building was inaugurated by Mission Director Jerry Bisson and the President of Pakistan, Mamnoon Hussain at the Gilgit-Baltistan campus.

International campuses of the university include:
KIU main campus, Gilgit
KIU sub campus, Hunza
KIU sub campus, Ghizar
KIU sub campus, Diamer , Chilas

See also 
 University of Karachi
 University of the Punjab
 University of Peshawar
 University of Gujrat

References

External links 
 

Educational institutions established in 2002
Public universities and colleges in Pakistan
Universities and colleges in Gilgit-Baltistan
2002 establishments in Pakistan